The 2021 Red Bull MotoGP Rookies Cup was the fifteenth season of the Red Bull MotoGP Rookies Cup. The season, for the ninth year contested by the riders on equal KTM 250cc 4-stroke Moto3 bikes, was held over 14 races in seven meetings on the Grand Prix motorcycle racing calendar, beginning at Algarve International Circuit, Portimão on 17 April and ending on 12 September at the MotorLand Aragón.

Calendar

Entry list

Championship standings
Points were awarded to the top fifteen riders, provided the rider finished the race.

References

External links

Red Bull MotoGP Rookies Cup
Red Bull MotoGP Rookies Cup racing seasons